The 1974 Paris–Roubaix was the 72nd edition of the Paris–Roubaix cycle race and was held on 7 April 1974. The race started in Compiègne and finished in Roubaix. The race was won by Roger De Vlaeminck of the Brooklyn team.

General classification

References

Paris–Roubaix
Paris-Roubaix
Paris-Roubaix
Paris-Roubaix
Paris-Roubaix